Team Unique is a senior-level synchronized skating team from Helsinki, Finland, representing the figure skating club Helsingfors Skridskoklubb (HSK). Established in 1993 and competing at the senior level since 1996, Team Unique are the 2013 world champions, 2009 world silver medalists and the 2013 and 2016 Finnish champions. Currently, they are ranked seventh in the world by the International Skating Union. The team's home club, HSK, is also the home club to the junior team Team Mystique.

History
Team Unique were established in 1993 and have competed at the senior level since 1996. Until the 2008–09 season, they stood out from the other Finnish top senior teams by having a few male skaters. Head-coached by Mirjami Penttinen since 2000, the team have a long history from the early 2000s of placing third behind Marigold IceUnity and Rockettes at the two Finnish Championships Qualifiers and Finnish Championships. 

By placing second or first at the national competitions and so beating Rockettes, Team Unique qualified as Team Finland 2 to the World Championships in 2002, 2003 and 2007, placing sixth, fourth and fifth, respectively, and in 2009, earning silver. The 2012–13 season was, however, historical for the team in terms of competition results – before winning the 2013 World Championships, they won Finlandia Trophy, the Cup of Berlin, the French Cup, the Second Finnish Championships Qualifier and the Finnish Championships. Team Unique's success continued abroad through the 2013–14 season as they won Finlandia Trophy and Leon Lurje Trophy and took their fourth straight victory at the French Cup. However, they placed second at both the national Qualifiers and third at the Finnish Championships, and consequently, did not qualify for the 2014 World Championships, under the season's coefficients on the three national competitions.

Programs

Competition results (1998–2008)

Competition results (2008–20)

Programs

Media appearances
Team Unique performed on the season one of the Finnish Dancing on Ice on 2 November 2013. They also appeared as background skaters in the December 2013 music video for "Selvästi päihtynyt" by Finnish pop singer Jenni Vartiainen.

References

External links 
 Official website of Team Unique

Senior synchronized skating teams
Sports teams in Finland
Figure skating in Finland
Sports clubs in Helsinki
World Synchronized Skating Championships medalists
1993 establishments in Finland